Lewis Lord Russell (born George Lewis Lord, September 10, 1889 – November 12, 1961) was an American actor of the 1930s, 1940s and 1950s who starred in a number of vaudeville shows, Broadway dramas and Hollywood films, including the Academy Award winning The Lost Weekend (1945) and the Marx Brothers film, A Night in Casablanca (1946).

Early life and work
Russell was born in Farmington, Illinois to British immigrants Samuel and Martha Jane (Wood) Lord, he was the only child of nine born in the United States and, curiously, the only one who developed an English accent. His father was an Illinois coal miner. After running away from home as a teenager, he began his life in the restaurant business, becoming an avid cook and eventually owning two restaurants. He also designed rugs and tapestries and worked as a tailor in New York, creating elaborate costumes for the stage.

Career
As a vaudeville actor, Russell toured the U.S. and played at the Palace Theater in Peoria, Illinois, at a time when the phrase "Will it play in Peoria?" was well-known to vaudevillians who tested out their routines and sketches in front of the demanding and often difficult-to-please Peoria crowds.

Billing himself as an actor from London,  Russell broke into the Broadway scene in the mid 1930s and starred as "The Squire" in the Broadway revival production of Emlyn Williams's The Corn is Green (1943) with leading lady Ethel Barrymore at the Martin Beck Theatre in New York. He also toured with actress Glenda Farrell for several years in the New Rochelle Circuit.  According to legend, he declined the starring role in The Man who Came to Dinner (1942) with Bette Davis, and created the role of the janitor in My Sister Eileen (1942/1955). He played Pancho Villa and had several starring roles in silent pictures, acting at least once opposite Pola Negri.  He also played Jane Wyman’s concerned father, Charles St. James, in The Lost Weekend, Ray Milland’s most popular film.

The playbill for the opening night of Bright Rebel (1938), a drama about the British Romantic-Era poet Lord Byron, features the following biographical note, which not only confirms Russell's adoption of an English identity but also suggests that he starred in many more plays than currently on record: "LEWIS L. RUSSELL (Lord Melbourne) is both an Englishman and an actor by birth. He was born in Leeds, England, shortly after his mother, a well-known English actress, gave one of those 'the show must go on' performances. With as dramatic a beginning as that he could hardly help getting back on the stage and there has been for some fifty years. A few scattered plays among the innumerable he has appeared in are 'The Rosary,' 'Lombardy, Ltd.,' 'The Bad Man,' 'Within the Law,' 'Madame X,' 'Accent on Youth,' and 'Yes My Darling Daughter.'"

Later life
He designed his own home in Pasadena, California, where he kept house, Ernest Hemingway-style, with his two-dozen cats. He died in Reseda, California at the age of 72.

Roles

Broadway

 Dead End (October 28, 1935 – June 12, 1937) as Medical Examiner
 London Assurance (February 18, 1937 – February 1937) as Max Harkaway
 Abe Lincoln in Illinois (October 15, 1938 – December 1939) as Judge Bowling Green
 Bright Rebel (December 27, 1938 – January 1939) as Lord Melbourne
 Return Engagement (November 1, 1940 – November 7, 1940) as Baldy Bemis
 Cuckoos on the Hearth (September 16, 1941 – January 3, 1942) as Zadoc Grimes
 The Corn Is Green (May 3, 1943 – June 19, 1943) as The Squire

Films

 The Affairs of Susan (1945) as Mr. Cusp
 Molly and Me (1945) as Sir Arthur Burroughs
 You Came Along (1945) as Chairman
 The Lost Weekend (1945) as Charles St. James
 Hold That Blonde! (1945) as Henry Carteret
 She Wouldn't Say Yes (1945) as Colonel Brady
 One Way to Love (1946) as Roger Winthrop
 A Night in Casablanca (1946, a Marx Bros. film) as Governor Galoux
 She Wrote the Book (1946) as George Dixon
 If I'm Lucky (1946) as P.H. Gillingwater (uncredited)
 Monsieur Beaucaire (1946) as Chief Justice (uncredited)
 Cross My Heart (1946) as Judge
 Ladies Man (1947) as David Harmon
 Jewels of Brandenburg (1947) as Roger Hamilton
 The Trouble with Women (1947) as Dr. Wilmer Dawson
 I Wonder Who's Kissing Her Now (1947) as T.J. Milford (uncredited)
 The Prince of Thieves (1948) as Sir Fitz-Alwin (uncredited)
 My Dog Rusty (1948) as Mayor Fulderwilder
 Kiss the Blood Off My Hands (1948) as Tom Widgery
 When the Redskins Rode (1951) as Gov. Dinwiddie
 The Underworld Story (1950) as Calvin
 Corky of Gasoline Alley (1951) as Hull (uncredited)
 Les Misérables (1952) as Waiter (uncredited)
 Against All Flags (1952) as Oxford  (uncredited)
 Sangaree (1953) as Capt. Bronson
 The King's Thief (1955) as Gentleman (uncredited)
 The Naked Hills (1956) as Baxter (uncredited) (final film role)

Television
 Public Prosecutor, episode "The Case of the Missing Hour" (1947) as Jerome O. Kendrick
 The Life of Riley, "Egbert's Chemistry Set" (1949) as Doctor
 China Smith, "Shanghai Clipper" (1952) as Lord Ratcliffe
 Front Page Detective, "Seven Seas to Danger" (1952) as Dr. Oscar Grandell
 Adventures of Superman, "Five Minutes to Doom" (1953) as W. T. Wayne
 I Married Joan, "Brad's Moustache" (1953) as a Member of the Nominating Committee

References

External links

 (archive)

1889 births
1961 deaths
American people of British descent
People from Farmington, Illinois
Male actors from Illinois
American male film actors
American male stage actors
Vaudeville performers
20th-century American male actors
People from Pasadena, California